KOI8-U (RFC 2319) is an 8-bit character encoding, designed to cover Ukrainian, which uses a Cyrillic alphabet. It is based on KOI8-R, which covers Russian and Bulgarian, but replaces eight box drawing characters with four Ukrainian letters Ґ, Є, І, and Ї in both upper case and lower case.

KOI8-RU is closely related, but adds Ў for Belarusian. In both, the letter allocations match those in KOI8-E, except for Ґ which is added to KOI8-F.

In Microsoft Windows, KOI8-U is assigned the code page number 21866. In IBM, KOI8-U is assigned code page/CCSID 1168.

KOI8 remains much more commonly used than ISO 8859-5, which never really caught on.  Another common Cyrillic character encoding is Windows-1251. In the future, both may eventually give way to Unicode.

KOI8 stands for Kod Obmena Informatsiey, 8 bit which means "Code for Information Exchange, 8 bit".

The KOI8 character sets have the property that the Russian Cyrillic letters are in pseudo-Roman order rather than the natural Cyrillic alphabetical order as in ISO 8859-5.  Although this may seem unnatural, it has the useful property that if the eighth bit is stripped, the text can still be read (or at least deciphered) in case-reversed transliteration on an ordinary ASCII terminal.  For instance, "Русский Текст" in KOI8-U becomes rUSSKIJ tEKST ("Russian Text") if the 8th bit is stripped.

Character set
The following table shows the KOI8-U encoding. Each character is shown with its equivalent Unicode code point.

Although RFC 2319 says that character 0x95 should be U+2219 (∙), it may also be U+2022 (•) to match the bullet character in Windows-1251.

Some references have a typo and incorrectly state that character 0xB4 is U+0403, rather than the correct U+0404.  This typo is present in Appendix A of RFC 2319 (but the table in the main text of the RFC gives the correct mapping).

See also
 KOI character encodings
 Ukrainian alphabet

References

Further reading

External links

 https://web.archive.org/web/20050206230944/http://www.net.ua/KOI8-U/

Character sets